Mount Gorham is a mountain just southwest of Mount Tricorn in the Hutton Mountains of Palmer Land, Antarctica. It was mapped by the United States Geological Survey from ground surveys and U.S. Navy air photos, 1961–67, and was named by the Advisory Committee on Antarctic Names after Charles E. Gorham, a builder with the South Pole Station winter party in 1967.

References

External links

Mountains of Palmer Land